The name Shortland may refer to a number of things:

Geography
 Shortland Island
 Shortland Islands
 Shortlands, a ward of the London Borough of Bromley
 Shortland, New South Wales
 Shortland's Bluff, an old name for Queenscliff, Victoria, Australia

People
Cate Shortland (born 1968), a writer and director of film and television.
Edward Shortland (1812–1893), doctor from New Zealand
John Shortland (Royal Navy officer) (1739–1803), Royal Navy officer and father of John Shortland
John Shortland (1769–1810), an explorer of Australia
Peter Shortland (1815-1888), Royal Navy officer and hydrographic surveyor
Ryan Shortland (born 1986), a rugby player
Willoughby Shortland (1804-1869), New Zealand's first Colonial Secretary

Other
Division of Shortland, an electoral division in Australia
Shortlands, an electoral division in Solomon Islands
Shortland Street, a New Zealand soap opera